Prinknash Abbey (pronounced locally variously as "Prinidge/Prinnish") is a Roman Catholic monastery in the Vale of Gloucester in the Diocese of Clifton, near the village of Cranham.  It belongs to the English Province of the Subiaco Cassinese Congregation, which is itself part of the worldwide Benedictine Confederation. It is noted for its manufacturing of incense.

History

Early History
For nearly 900 years the land known as Prinknash has been associated with Benedictine monks. In 1096 the Giffard family, who had come to England with William the Conqueror, made a gift of the land to Serlo, Abbot of Saint Peter's, Gloucester. A large part of the present building was built during the abbacy of William Parker, the last Abbot of Gloucester, around the year 1520. 

It remained in the abbey's hands until the suppression of the monasteries in 1541 when it was rented from the Crown by Sir Anthony Kingston who was to provide 40 deer annually to King Henry VIII, who used the House as a hunting lodge. Prinknash Park continued to be used as a home for the gentry and nobility of Gloucestershire during the next few centuries and each generation left its mark on the property.

Recent History
On 1 August 1928 a Deed of Covenant was made out by the twentieth Earl of Rothes, the grandson of  Thomas Dyer Edwardes who had converted to Catholicism in old age, and whose wish was that Prinknash should be given to the Benedictine monks of Caldey Island. These monks had themselves converted from Anglicanism to Roman Catholicism in 1913 under the leadership of Abbot Ælred Carlyle, although he left monastic life in 1921 to work as a missionary priest in Vancouver. Abbot Aelred returned to the community in 1950 and died in 1955.

Caldey Island was eventually sold to the Cistercian monks and on 26 October 1928 six Benedictine monks arrived from Caldey to convert the house at Prinknash into a monastery. The rest soon followed and after some years of poverty they managed to purchase all the land around the house to make Prinknash as it is today. Fr. Wilfrid Upson, who had been appointed Prior after Carlyle's departure, was elected the first Abbot of Prinknash in 1937. 

The community continued to grow, beginning with 25 monks.  In 1939 a foundation stone for a new abbey was laid at Prinknash by Cardinal Hinsley, but the Second World War intervened and the previous impracticable building plans were eventually redrawn by F.G. Broadbent. In 1947, they refounded St Michael's Abbey, Farnborough, Hampshire, and in 1948, refounded Pluscarden Priory, Elgin, Moray, Scotland.  The monks moved into the new abbey in 1972 and the old abbey, was re-roofed, re-furnished, and converted into a retreat and conference centre, known as "St Peter's Grange". However, by 2008 the now smaller community of monks had decided to move back to St Peter's Grange, and this took place on the Feast of Saints Peter and Paul (30 June) in that same year. 

Male guests are accommodated in the monastery itself, please write to the Guestmaster, Prinknash Abbey, Cranham, Gloucester, GL4 8EX.

The large and abandoned abbey  building (the 1972 Abbey as it is known) will shortly be refurbished and the front part of it will become home to a community of ex-Anglican Benedictine Nuns, the Sisters of the Blessed Virgin Mary, from Kingstanding in Birmingham.

Prinknash Pottery
In the early 1940s, one of the monks, Dom Asaph Harris, made experiments with clay from the foundations of the new abbey. Other monks, especially Thomas Morey, took this up and after World War II, Prinknash Pottery was set up on a commercial basis.  This Pottery flourished exceedingly for fifty years, and then declined, being closed in 2003. The original clay items (pots made with red clay from the foundations of the 1972 Abbey) are now collectable, and sometimes appear on the Antiques Road Show.

The Cinema Museum holds film of the Abbey in 1967. HMO363

Horarium
In addition to the daily canonical hours, the monks pray Mass at 8:30 am every day including Sunday. They no longer celebrate Mass in the Extraordinary Form.

Art
In 1972–3, Brother Patrick, a monk of Prinknash, contributed the design and manufacture of a number of items at Clifton Cathedral, Bristol. These included the votive candelabra hanging in the Lady Chapel, made from twenty stainless steel equilateral triangles (a regular icosahedron), and the decorative screens to the Blessed Sacrament Chapel.  Dom Sylvester Houédard, d. 1992 aged 67, was a world-famous concrete poet and theologian who specialised in inter-religious dialogue. His archive is kept by the John Rylands University of Manchester Library.  Dom Stephen Horton, living, is a noted local artist, watercolourist, and portrait painter, and a spiritual father to many people. He is also currently the local superior at Prinknash.

Notes
1.  According to their website and their video about making incense:

References

External links
Prinknash Abbey website
BBC archive film of Prinknash Abbey from 1980
The History of Prinknash Abbey Incense and How It is Made

Monasteries in Gloucestershire
Benedictine monasteries in England
681 establishments
7th-century establishments in England
Christian monasteries established in the 7th century
1541 disestablishments in England
1928 establishments in England
20th-century Christian monasteries
Grade I listed churches in Gloucestershire
Grade I listed monasteries
20th-century Roman Catholic church buildings in the United Kingdom